Hieracium subcaesium is a species of flowering plant belonging to the family Asteraceae.

Synonym:
 Hieracium subcaesium subsp. subcaesium

References

subcaesium